Songs of the Ungrateful Living is the sixth solo studio album by the American recording artist Everlast. It was released on October 18, 2011, a follow-up to Love, War and the Ghost of Whitey Ford, by Martyr Inc Records in partnership with EMI. This was Everlast's second record released on his own label.

The album peaked at No. 48 on the Billboard 200, and its lead single, "I Get By", peaked at No. 23 on the Billboard Alternative Songs.

Track listing

Notes
"A Change Is Gonna Come" is a cover version of Sam Cooke's song "A Change Is Gonna Come" from Ain't That Good News (1964).
Samples
"Gone for Good" samples "Blue Suede Shoes" by Carl Perkins (1956).
"I Get By" samples "Dirt In The Ground" by Tom Waits (1992) and "Top Billin'" by Audio Two (1987).
"My House" samples "Get Out of My Life, Woman" by Iron Butterfly (1968).
"The Rain" samples "Till Death Do Us Part" by Cypress Hill (2004).

Personnel

Erik Francis Schrody – vocals, guitar, producer, executive producer
Darius Holbert – backing vocals, pedal steel guitar, keyboards, banjo, co-producer
Joe Blaq – backing vocals
Sharon Youngblood – backing vocals
Joel Whitley – guitar, bass guitar
Keefus Ciancia – keyboards
Leo Costa – drums, percussion
Leor DiMant – drum programming, scratches
David Rojas – drum programming
Gabriel Noel – cello, viola, bass guitar
Dan Boissy – tenor saxophone, baritone saxophone
Kerry Loeschen – trombone
Sebastian Leger – trumpet
Tom Baker – mastering
Jamey Staub – mixing
Joe Reiver – recording, additional producer
Ivory Daniel – management, executive producer
Kevin Zinger – management, executive producer
Farid Nassar – co-producer (track 11)
Lucas Irwin – design
Tristan Eaton – cover art

Charts

References

2011 albums
Everlast (musician) albums